Ruth Shepley  (May 29, 1892 - October 16, 1951) was an American stage actress from Providence, Rhode Island  who appeared in comedies such as It Pays to Advertise (1914). A Broadway performer, she was trim, with blonde hair, and medium height. She was educated in Paris. Shepley was a close friend of Helen Hayes and Douglas Fairbanks Sr.

Acting career

Shepley's debut as an actress came in 1908 at the Bijou Theatre. She appeared in All For A Girl. Subsequent performances at the same venue 
included acting in A Gentleman of Leisure (1911), The Brute (1912), The Fatted Calf (1912), Nearly Married (1913), and It Pays To Advertise (1914). Quite a few of her early stage work came under the management of David Belasco and George M. Cohan.

Her most noted production was The Boomerang (1915) in which Shepley played the part of Grace Tyler at the Belasco Theatre. 
In 1921  Shepley appeared at the Cort Theatre in Her Salary Man. The following year she made her first London performance in Lawful Larceny. Her final work as an actress came with Helen Hayes in Ladies and Gentlemen (1939), a production staged in Santa Barbara, California.

During World War I Shepley was a captain in the American Women's Voluntary Services. In World War II she was featured in an eight-month tour of the Pacific Rim in Dear Ruth. The entertainment was under the auspices of the United Services Organization.

Personal life

Shepley married Gordon Sarre in 1920, a union which was dissolved in 1932. She was survived by her second husband, the New York surgeon Dr. Beverly C. Smith, whom she married in 1932.

She lived at 28 East 73rd Street in Greenwich, Connecticut.

Filmography

References

External links

1892 births
1951 deaths
American stage actresses
Actors from Providence, Rhode Island
20th-century American actresses